Mesogona olivata is a moth of the family Noctuidae. It is found from southern coastal and interior British Columbia south through California, Colorado and Texas. It most likely also occurs in northern Mexico.

The wingspan is about 36 mm. Adults are on wing from August to November.

The larvae feed on various deciduous shrubs and trees, including poplar, oak, hazel, amelanchier, alder, antelope brush, Symphoricarpos, and Berberis. It has been reared from Quercus garryana, Ceanothus velutinus and Quercus agrifolia.

External links
Bug Guide
A revision of Mesogona Boisduval (Lepidoptera: Noctuidae)for North America with descriptions of two new species
Images

Xyleninae
Moths of North America